On the Road is the first DJ mix album by French singer and DJ Miss Kittin, released on 12 February 2002 by Terminal M.

Critical reception

Jason Birchmeier of AllMusic described the album as "a wholehearted appeal to the more respectable and long-standing techno establishment", that proves her status "as a DJ rather than an electroclash diva", having "both the technical skills as well as the creativity to complement her unquestionably novel personality."

Track listing

References

2002 compilation albums
Miss Kittin albums